Jaromír Zápal (March 18, 1923 in Brandýs nad Orlicí – December 5, 1984 in Prague) was a Czechoslovak illustrator, painter and writer. He is mainly known as an illustrator of children books.

Zápal studied at the Academy of Arts, Architecture and Design (Vysoká škola uměleckoprůmyslová) in Prague. Later he worked as a graphics art editor for publishing houses Státní nakladatelství dětské knihy (SNDK), which in 1969 became Albatros, publishers for children and youth, i. e. specializing on children and youth literature. Among his most known works are the rendition of Winnie the Pooh   (first published in 1958) and illustrations for the Neznaika trilogy by Nikolai Nosov (first published in 1957, 1961 and 1976). Zápal also wrote and illustrated several child books (the last being published posthumously in 1986).

Literature
 František Holešovský, Blanka Stehlíková, Luboš Hlaváček: Čeští ilustrátoři v současné knize pro děti a mládež (Czech illustrators in contemporary literature for children and the youth), Albatros, Prague, 1989.

External links
 Short biography with selection of works (in Czech)
 Czech translation of Neznaika trilogy online, complete with illustrations by Zápal

1923 births
1984 deaths
Czechoslovak illustrators